Pipecolic acidemia is a very rare autosomal recessive metabolic disorder that is caused by a peroxisomal defect.

Pipecolic acidemia can also be an associated component of Refsum disease with increased pipecolic acidemia (RDPA), as well as other peroxisomal disorders, including both infantile and adult Refsum disease, and Zellweger syndrome.

The disorder is characterized by an increase in pipecolic acid levels in the blood, leading to neuropathy and hepatomegaly.

See also
 AASDHPPT
 PHYH

References

External links 

Amino acid metabolism disorders
Autosomal recessive disorders
Rare diseases